= Singharamulla =

Coordinates: 6°57′N 79°54′E

Singharamulla සිංහමුල්ලා சிங்காரமுல்லா
- suburb
- Interactive map of Singharamulla
- Country: Sri Lanka
- Province: Western Province
- Time zone: UTC+5:30 (Sri Lanka Standard Time)

Singharamulla (Sinhala: සිංහමුල්ලා, Tamil: சிங்காரமுல்லா) is a town located in Western Province, Sri Lanka.
